Douglas Abdell (born 1947) is an American sculptor, living and working in Málaga, Spain.

Early life and education

Abdell was born in Boston, Massachusetts in 1947, to parents of Lebanese and Italian origin. In 1970 he graduated from Syracuse University with a bachelor of Fine Arts in sculpture.

Career
Abdell is predominately a sculptor and has worked with cast and welded bronze, welded steel, and carved stone. In the early eighties he had a period of painting with oil, acrylics and mixed media collage works. In the last 30 years his work has been devoted to political and social themes related to the Mediterranean Countries and their history more specifically Phoenician and Arabic with their specific symbols and languages. The materials of these works are cast bronze, carved stone and etchings. He is currently living in Málaga, Spain.

Selected exhibitions

Individual Exhibitions
 1971 – Graham Gallery, New York City.
 1972 – Graham Gallery, New York City.
 1977 – Andrew Crispo Gallery, New York City.
 1979 – Andrew Crispo Gallery, New York City.
 1979 – Park Avenue, New York City, New York.
 1981 – Amerika Haus Berlin, West Germany.
 1981 – "Berlín Phoenaes", Mike Steiner Studio Galerie, Berlin, Germany.
 1981 – Dartmouth College Museum & Galleries Beaumont-May Gallery, Hopkins Center for the Arts, Hanover, New Hampshire.
 1981 – Marisa del Re Gallery, New York City, New York.
 1982 – Andrew Crispo Gallery, New York City.
 1983 – Gallozzi-La Placa Gallery, New York City.
 1985 – Spoleto Festival USA, Charleston, South Carolina.
 1991 – "La Quarta Guerra Punica", Galleria Massimo Riposati, Roma, Italy.
 1991 – "La Quarta Guerra Punica", Galleria Agorá, Palermo, Sicilia, Italy.
 1995 – "La unió dels Estats Fenicis", Pati Llimona, Barcelona, Spain.
 1996 – "La unió deIs Estats Fenicis" Casal de Vespella de Gaiá Catalunya, Pati Llimona, Barcelona, Spain.
 1996 – "Abdell, Unión de Los Estados Fenicios" Museo Pablo Gargallo, Zaragoza, Spain.
 2005 – "Abdell, El retorno del Fenicio" Museo de Adra, Centro de Arte, Adra, Almería, Spain.
 2017 – "Abdell, El retorno del Fenicio" Museo de Chiclana, Chiclana de la Frontera, Cádiz, Spain.
 2018 – "Abdell, El retorno del Fenicio" Museum of Cádiz, Cádiz, Spain.
 2019 – "Abdell, El retorno del Fenicio" Antonio Gala Foundation, Córdoba, Spain.
 2021 – "Douglas Abdell: Reconstructed Trap House" Ab/Anbar Gallery at Cromwell Place, London.
 2022 – "Douglas Abdell: Yads, Phoenaes, Aekyads 1971-1981" - MAMCO, Musée d'Art Moderne et Contemporain, Genève.

Collective Exhibitions
 1980 – Douglas Abdell and Mia Westerlund: Sculpture and Drawings - Storm King Art Center, Mountainville, New York.
 1983 – Abdell, Basquiat, Brown, Cutrone, De Palma, Haring, Rammellzee - XVII Rassegna Internazionale d'Arte di Acireale, Palazzo di Città, Acireale, Sicilia, Italia.
 1984 – Written Imagery Unleashed in the 20th Century - Fine Arts Museum of Long Island, New York, United States.
 2020 – Writing by Drawing. When language seeks its other. - Contemporary Art Center, Geneva, Switzerland.
 2022 – 3rd Geneva Biennale—Sculpture Garden, Geneva, Switzerland.

Works in museums and public collections

 Corcoran Gallery of Art, Washington, D.C.
 H. H. Thyssen-Bornemisza Collection, Lugano, Switzerland.
 Ulrich Museum of Art, Wichita State University, Wichita, Kansas.
 Storm King Art Center, Mountainville, New York.
 Kansas State University, Manhattan, Kansas.
 Fogg Art Museum, Harvard University, Cambridge, Massachusetts.
 Brooklyn Museum, New York City, New York.
 Hood Museum of Art, Dartmouth.
 Mc Nay Art Institute, San Antonio, Texas.
 Wichita Art Museum, Wichita, Kansas.
 University of Notre Dame, Snite Museum of Art, Notre Dame, Indiana.
 Figge Art Museum, Davenport, Iowa.
 John Jay Park, East 76th Street & York Avenue, New York City, New York.
 Ruth and Marvin Sackner Archives, Miami, Florida.
 Tabor College, Hillsboro, Kansas.
 Brandeis University, Rose Art Museum, Waltham, Massachusetts.
 Gibbes Museum of Art, Charleston, South Carolina.
 Quadrat Museum, Bottrop, West Germany.
 Mississippi Museum of Art, Jackson, Mississippi.
 Spencer Museum of Art, University of Kansas, Lawrence, Kansas.
 Stanford University, Stanford California.
 Centre national des arts plastiques, Paris, France.
 MAMCO, Museum of Modern and Contemporary Art, Geneva, Switzerland.
 Barjeel Art Foundation, Sharjah, United Arab Emirates.

Bibliography

References

External links
 wikiart.org: The works of Douglas Abdell.
 askart.com: Biography of Douglas Abdell
 Douglas Abdell: sculptures 1992-1995
 Last works of Douglas Abdell: abdellmagua.com 
 Amerika Haus: Douglas Abdell: neue Skulpturen catalogue of the exposition
 Brooklyn Museum: Drawing for the Sculpture "Pnauxae-Aekyad" 1977.
 Fogg Museum Harvard Art Museums: Douglas Abdell

Living people
1947 births
20th-century American sculptors
Syracuse University College of Visual and Performing Arts alumni
American expatriates in Spain
Sculptors from Massachusetts
People from Boston
21st-century American sculptors